Inukjuak – Innalik School, part of the Kativik School Board, is a primary and secondary School in Inukjuak, Quebec, Nunavik (Quebec) with more than 400 students. The school program is divided into three sections:
Inuktitut program—kindergarten and primary cycle (more than 100 students)
French section as a second language—primary and secondary cycles (around 150 students)
English section as a second language—primary and secondary cycle (around 150 students)

The teaching staff is more than 40 teachers including 15 in the Inuit section and around 5 specialist teachers in various domains.

School in Inuuvunga: I Am Inuk, I Am Alive Documentary

The school became famous after being featured in the 2004 documentary Inuuvunga: I Am Inuk, I Am Alive (58 minutes) when 8 Inuit high school students from the school documented their final year in the high school.

The film was done in Inuktitut with subtitles in English and was produced by National Film Board of Canada (NFB), (including Sally Bochner as executive producer and Pierre Lapointe as producer. The film chronicles their efforts to learn how to come of age in a rapidly changing culture, while coping with issues like suicide and substance abuse.

NFB had dispatched EyeSteelFilm directors Daniel Cross, Mila Aung-Thwin, Brett Gaylor to Inukjuak – Innalik School, Nunavik, Quebec, to teach the students the skills of filming. The students who took part in the filming were:

Bobby Echalook
Caroline Ningiuk
Dora Ohaituk
Laura Iqaluk
Linus Kasudluak
Rita-Lucy Ohaituk
Sarah Idlout
Willia Ningeok

Synopsis of the Documentary 
Hockey, hip hop, hunting and midnight Ski-Doo rides. Welcome to Inukjuak. It's the final year of high school for eight teens at Innalik school in this remote town in northern Quebec. These eight students, through the initiative of NFB, have been selected to document this pivotal year of their lives. To teach them some basics, the NFB has dispatched filmmakers Daniel Cross and Mila Aung-Thwin. The result of their collaboration is Inuuvunga, a vibrant and utterly contemporary view of life in Canada's North. The students use their new film skills to address a broad range of issues, from the widening communication gap with their elders to the loss of their peers to suicide. Throughout, they reveal an unusual and fascinating mix of southern and northern cultures. Kids listen to hip-hop music and engage in traditional fox trapping. A schoolroom floor is the scene of the gutting of a freshly killed seal. Seamless and startling, Inuuvunga paints a rich portrait of coming of age in an Inuit town and helps to dispel the myths of northern isolation and desolation. Instead, we discover a place where hope and strength overcome struggle.

In the remote northern town of Inukjuak, Nunavik, 8 Inuit teenagers are given cameras to document their final year of high school. The film chronicles their efforts to learn how to come of age in a rapidly changing culture, while coping with issues like suicide and substance abuse. This film is available for purchase via the National Film Board of Canada.

See also
Daniel Cross
Brett Gaylor
Mila Aung-Thwin

References

External links
Inukjuak – Innalik School website
EyeSteelFilm page about Inuuvunga: I Am Inuk, I Am alive

Schools in Quebec
Buildings and structures in Nord-du-Québec
Nunavik
Educational institutions in Canada with year of establishment missing